Hoàng Lê nhất thống chí (Records of the Unification of Imperial Lê), also known as An Nam nhất thống chí (Records of the Unification of Annam), written by the Writers of Ngô family (Ngô gia văn phái), is a Vietnamese historical novel written in Classical Chinese which consists of 17 chapter based upon the events in the turbulent late 18th century in Vietnam, starting with the political struggles in the final years of lords Trịnh Sâm's reign and ending with Lê emperor Chiêu Thống's remains returned to Vietnam after Gia Long's unification of the country.

List of chapters

External links 
 The Han Tu version of Hoàng Lê nhất thống chí 

Chinese-language novels of Vietnam
Nguyen dynasty texts
History books about Vietnam